Carnegie Learning, Inc. is a provider of K-12 education services for math, literacy and ELA, world languages, and applied sciences.

Carnegie Learning, Inc. is located in the Union Trust Building in Pittsburgh, PA.

Products 
Carnegie Learning's MATHia software was created by researchers from Carnegie Mellon University.

In 2020, Carnegie Learning added Fast ForWord, a reading and language software, to its portfolio.

Other products include:

 World languages textbooks and resources for Spanish, French, German, Chinese, and Italian
 Textbooks and software for computer science, economics, biotechnology, anatomy, and physiology

Acquisitions
On August 2, 2011, The Apollo Group announced its intent to acquire Carnegie Learning for $75 million. The Apollo Group also acquired related technology from Carnegie Mellon University for $21.5 million paid over a period of ten years. The transaction was completed in September 2011.

On November 06, 2015, the Apollo Education Group, Inc., signed an agreement for a group of Chicago-based investors with deep K-12 education experience to acquire Carnegie Learning, Inc.

In 2018, Carnegie Learning was acquired by private equity firm CIP Capital. New Mountain Learning, a publishing company owned by CIP, was merged into Carnegie Learning. New Mountain imprints include EMC, Paradigm, and JIST. In 2020, Kendall Hunt Publishing Company acquired Paradigm and JIST.

References
 

Book publishing companies based in Pennsylvania
Carnegie Mellon University
Publishing companies established in 1994
Apollo Education Group
1994 establishments in Pennsylvania